Valeriy Zamyatin (born 5 January 1979), is a Ukrainian futsal player who plays for Enakievez Enakievo and the Ukraine national futsal team.

References

External links
UEFA profile

1979 births
Living people
Ukrainian men's futsal players